Sir Arthur Brinsley Brooke, 2nd Baronet (1797 – 21 November 1854), was an Anglo-Irish Conservative politician.

Brooke was the eldest son of Sir Henry Brooke, 1st Baronet, and his wife Harriet, daughter of The Hon. John Butler.

In 1831 he served as High Sheriff of Fermanagh and in 1840 was returned to Parliament as one of two representatives for Fermanagh, a seat he held until his death fourteen years later.

Lisnaskea Poor Law Union was formally declared on 27 June 1840 and in August that year Sir Arthur Brooke was elected chairman.

Brooke married The Hon. Julia Henrietta, daughter of General Sir George Anson, in 1841. They had several children and their descendants include Field Marshal Sir Alan Brooke, 1st Viscount Alanbrooke, and Sir Basil Brooke, 1st Viscount Brookeborough. Brooke died in November 1854 and was succeeded in the baronetcy by his eldest son, Victor. Lady Brooke died in December 1886.

References

Kidd, Charles, Williamson, David (editors). Debrett's Peerage and Baronetage (1990 edition). New York: St Martin's Press, 1990.

www.thepeerage.com

External links

1797 births
1854 deaths
Baronets in the Baronetage of the United Kingdom
Members of the Parliament of the United Kingdom for County Fermanagh constituencies (1801–1922)
UK MPs 1837–1841
UK MPs 1841–1847
UK MPs 1847–1852
UK MPs 1852–1857
High Sheriffs of County Fermanagh
Irish Conservative Party MPs